Tinospora is a genus of succulent woody climbing shrubs. Thirty-four species are currently recognized. Species generally send down long aerial roots from host trees. They have corky or papery bark. They are found in tropical and sub-tropical parts of Asia, Africa and Australia. The most common species are T. cordifolia and T. crispa.

Species
Tinospora species accepted by the Plants of the World Online as of April 2021:

Tinospora arfakiana 
Tinospora baenzigeri 
Tinospora bakis 
Tinospora celebica 
Tinospora cordifolia 
Tinospora crispa 
Tinospora dentata 
Tinospora dissitiflora 
Tinospora esiangkara 
Tinospora formanii 
Tinospora fragosa 
Tinospora glabra 
Tinospora glandulosa 
Tinospora guangxiensis 
Tinospora hainanensis 
Tinospora hirsuta 
Tinospora homosepala 
Tinospora macrocarpa 
Tinospora maqsoodiana 
Tinospora merrilliana 
Tinospora neocaledonica 
Tinospora nudiflora 
Tinospora orophila 
Tinospora palminervis 
Tinospora sagittata 
Tinospora siamensis 
Tinospora sinensis 
Tinospora smilacina 
Tinospora subcordata 
Tinospora sumatrana 
Tinospora teijsmannii 
Tinospora tenera 
Tinospora tinosporoides 
Tinospora trilobata

References

Menispermaceae genera
Menispermaceae